Mati Põldre (23 October 1936 – 7 February 2023) was an Estonian film director, scenarist and operator.

Põldre was born in Tallinn. From 1968 he worked at Eesti Telefilm. During the 1990s he worked at film production company Lege Artis Film.

Põldre was married to journalist, screenwriter and politician Ela Tomson. He died on 7 February 2023, at the age of 86.

Filmography
 1968 Meie Artur (documentary film; co-director, cinematographer and co-scenarist)
 1969 Perpetuum mobile (TV short film; director)
 1969 Mitte üksnes leivast (TV film; co-director)
 1970 Echoes of the Past (feature film; co-scenarist) 
 1977 Igavesti Teie (TV film; director)
 1984 Kevad südames (feature film; director and scenarist) 
 1992 Those Old Love Letters (feature film; director and scenarist) 
 2007 Georg (feature film; scenarist)

References

External links
 

1936 births
2023 deaths
Soviet film directors
Soviet screenwriters
Estonian film directors
Estonian screenwriters
People from Tallinn
Communist Party of Estonia politicians
Soviet documentary film directors
Estonian documentary film directors
Soviet cinematographers
Estonian cinematographers